Harristown is a village in Macon County, Illinois, United States. The population was 1,310 at the 2020 census. It is included in the Decatur, Illinois Metropolitan Statistical Area.

History
The village was named in honor of Major Thomas L. Harris, who was elected and served as Major of the Fourth Illinois Regiment in the Mexican–American War, and who was afterward a member of Congress from 1849 to 1858.

The first settlers arrived in 1828 and began building log cabins and improving land around the area. 1841 saw the building of the township’s first schoolhouse, a log building, and served as both the school and as a place of worship until 1853 when the first church was built. Harristown was along the main line of the Wabash Railroad, which contributed to increased population and business.

Harristown was the first Illinois home of Abraham Lincoln. During that winter, Lincoln, together with his stepmother's son, John D. Johnston, and John Hanks were hired by Denton Offutt to build a flatboat and navigate it from Beardstown, Illinois, down the Illinois and Mississippi rivers to New Orleans. It was during this time that Lincoln saw slavery first-hand for the first time.

Lincoln departed the Harristown area in the spring of 1831. Lincoln Trail Homestead State Park was created in 1904 and marks the spot where his cabin stood.

Geography
Harristown is located in western Macon County at  (39.842673, −89.069495). It lies within Harristown Township and is bordered to the east by the city of Decatur, the county seat.

The village is drained to the south by tributaries of the Sangamon River.

Demographics

As of the census of 2000, there were 1,338 people, 511 households, and 402 families residing in the village. The racial makeup of the village was 98.88% White, 0.30% African American, 0.07% Native American, 0.07% Asian, and 0.67% from two or more races. Hispanic or Latino people of any race were 0.30% of the population.

There were 511 households, out of which 32.3% had children under the age of 18 living with them, 68.5% were married couples living together, 6.5% had a female householder with no husband present, and 21.3% were non-families. 19.0% of all households were made up of individuals, and 8.0% had someone living alone who was 65 years of age or older. The average household size was 2.62 and the average family size was 2.98.

In the village, the population was spread out, with 25.1% under the age of 18, 6.5% from 18 to 24, 29.8% from 25 to 44, 25.3% from 45 to 64, and 13.3% who were 65 years of age or older. The median age was 39 years. For every 100 females, there were 100.9 males. For every 100 females age 18 and over, there were 96.5 males.

The median income for a household in the village was $42,946, and the median income for a family was $48,162. Males had a median income of $37,273 versus $23,750 for females. The per capita income for the village was $18,689. About 4.1% of families and 5.0% of the population were below the poverty line, including 9.2% of those under age 18 and 3.5% of those age 65 or over.

Notable people
 Cecil Garriott, MLB player for the Chicago Cubs
 Abraham Lincoln, statesman and 16th president of the United States
 Lawrence Rotz (1897–1963), Illinois state senator, businessman, and politician

References

External links

 

Villages in Macon County, Illinois
Villages in Illinois